Pazanuyeh (also Romanized as Pāzanūyeh; also known as Pāznū) is a village in Jolgah Rural District, in the Central District of Jahrom County, Fars Province, Iran. At the 2006 census, its population was 203, in 38 families.

References 

Populated places in Jahrom County